BBC London News (referred to onscreen as BBC London) is the BBC's regional television news programme for Greater London and its surrounding areas. Its local competitor is ITV News London, which is produced by ITN for ITV London.

BBC London News is broadcast seven days a week on BBC One in London and the surrounding areas, with three-minute updates during BBC Breakfast and 15-minute bulletins after the BBC News at One and the BBC News at Ten. The flagship programme airs between 6.30pm and 7pm each weekday after the BBC News at Six and is usually presented by Riz Lateef. Weekend bulletins are broadcast on Saturday and Sunday evenings. Lateef became the main presenter of the flagship programme in March 2006, when she replaced Emily Maitlis who left to join the BBC News Channel and BBC Two's Newsnight.

Weather forecasts are included within bulletins, presented by either Kate Kinsella or Elizabeth Rizzini. The weekday evening weather forecast is usually presented from the roof of the programme's production base at BBC Broadcasting House or at the location of an outside broadcast from earlier in the programme. Other forecasts are presented primarily from within the BBC London News studio or the BBC Weather studio.

Originally broadcast from studios in Marylebone High Street, the programme moved to the newly built Egton Wing of Broadcasting House in January 2013. Egton Wing was subsequently renamed John Peel Wing.

History

The programme launched on 1 October 2001 as BBC LDN after a major reorganisation of the BBC's South East region, with the London area splitting away to form its own separate region. The previous programme, Newsroom South East, had gradually decreased in its coverage as certain areas were switched to receive other regional news programmes. Following the launch of South East Today, a brand new programme for the new South East region, Newsroom South East was effectively broadcasting solely to the London area for a short while before it became BBC London News.

During planning, the programme for London had been named London Live, also at the time the name of the region's BBC Local Radio station; titles were produced by the Lambie-Nairn design agency but never shown onscreen.

The eventual title became BBC London, though the programme is always referred to by presenters as BBC London News, while programme titles were originally BBC LDN: an abbreviation of 'London'.

The area created for the BBC London programme to broadcast to now covers a much more tightly defined area, chiefly Greater London but still including parts of Bedfordshire, Essex and Hertfordshire in the East of England region and parts of Berkshire, Buckinghamshire, Hampshire, Kent, Oxfordshire, Surrey and Sussex in the South East England region. There is also some overlap with the editorial areas of other BBC regions in this part of England. Parts of Oxfordshire, Buckinghamshire, Wiltshire, Northamptonshire, Berkshire and Gloucestershire now take an opt-out of South Today, while most of Kent and East Sussex has (since 2001) been covered by the BBC South East region based in Tunbridge Wells, which produces South East Today.

In 2020, the weekday lunchtime bulletin of BBC London News merged with that of South East Today to join forces with the latest on COVID-19 as BBC London and South East, hosted by the South East Today team in Tunbridge Wells.. All other bulletins remain separate between the two regions.

On 18 October 2022 (coinciding the corporation's 100 years of broadcasting) BBC London News merged production teams with BBC News at 6 and 10 teams. This resulted in them moving to Studio B in Broadcasting House for those programs. Breakfast, lunchtime, and weekend bulletins continue to produce in a redesigned Studio D of the said building.

Satellite broadcast
The programme can be viewed throughout the UK (and Europe) on digital satellite channel 974 on the BBC UK regional TV on satellite service.

Presenters

News Presenters
Victoria Hollins (secondary)
Asad Ahmad (primary)
 Riz Lateef (tertiary)
 Alice Bhandhukravi
 Sonja Jessup
 Frankie McCamley

Weather
Georgina Burnett
Matt Taylor
John Hammond

Former Presenters
Emily Maitlis (1 October 2001- 24 March 2006) 
Mike Ramsden (2001-2011) 
Nina Hossain (2001-2004) 
Gillian Joseph (2001-2004) 
Matt Barbet (2003-2006) 
Samantha Simmonds (2004-2005)

Travel 
Katie Allen

See also

BBC News
BBC London
BBC London and South East

References

External links
 
Cosa sapeva la BBC di Rothschild su Jimmy Savile

BBC Regional News shows
2010s British television series
2020s British television series
2001 British television series debuts
Television news in London
English-language television shows